Johnnie L. Dixon (born September 16, 1994) is an American football wide receiver for the New Orleans Breakers of the United States Football League (USFL). He played college football at Ohio State and was signed as an undrafted free agent by the Houston Texans after the 2019 NFL Draft.

College career
Dixon was ranked as a fourstar recruit by 247Sports.com coming out of high school. He committed to Ohio State on December 17, 2013.

Professional career

Houston Texans

Dixon signed with the Houston Texans as an undrafted free agent after the 2019 NFL Draft. Dixon was released as the Texans made final roster cuts before the regular season on August 31, 2019.

Arizona Cardinals

On September 3, 2019, Dixon was signed to the practice squad of the Arizona Cardinals. He spent the entire season on the practice squad and was signed to a future/reserve contract on December 30, 2019. He was placed on injured reserve on September 6, 2020, and was waived/injured the next day.

Dallas Cowboys
Dixon signed with the Dallas Cowboys on May 25, 2021. He was waived on August 31, 2021.

New Orleans Breakers
Dixon was selected in the 14th round of the 2022 USFL Draft by the New Orleans Breakers. He was named a starter at wide receiver, leading the team in both receptions and receiving touchdowns, registering 37 receptions for 359 yards and 4 touchdowns. He was voted the Week 3 USFL Offensive Player of the Week.

References

1994 births
Living people
American football wide receivers
Ohio State University alumni
Ohio State Buckeyes football players
Players of American football from Florida
Sportspeople from West Palm Beach, Florida
New Orleans Breakers (2022) players